Aust-Torpa is a village in Nordre Land Municipality in Innlandet county, Norway. Kinn Church and an elementary school are both located in the village.

References

Nordre Land
Villages in Innlandet